Jean Lucienbonnet (born Jean Bonnet, January 7, 1923 in Nice – died August 19, 1962 in Enna-Pergusa, Sicily, Italy) was a racing driver from France, racing and rallying in various series. His single Formula One World Championship entry was the 1959 Monaco Grand Prix with his Cooper T45, but he failed to qualify. He was killed in a Formula Junior race in Sicily in 1962.

Complete Formula One World Championship results
(key)

References
 

French racing drivers
Racing drivers who died while racing
Sport deaths in Italy
French Formula One drivers
1923 births
1962 deaths
24 Hours of Le Mans drivers
World Sportscar Championship drivers
Sportspeople from Nice